Nesterenko is a Ukrainian surname meaning son or daughter of Nester/Nestor.

It can refer to the following people:

 Eric Nesterenko (1933–2022), Canadian ice hockey player
 Igor Nesterenko (born 1990), Israeli-Ukrainian basketball player
 Ivan Nesterenko (born 2003), Ukrainian football player
 Lada Nesterenko (born 1976), Ukrainian cross country skier
 Roman Nesterenko (born 1977), Kazakh football player
 Vassili Nesterenko (1934–2008), Belarusian physicist
 Yevgeny Nesterenko (1938–2021), Russian opera singer
 Yulia Nestsiarenka (born 1979), Belarusian sprinter
 Yuri Leonidovich Nesterenko (born 1972), Russian writer and antisexual activist
 Yuri Valentinovich Nesterenko (born 1946), Russian mathematician

See also
 

Ukrainian-language surnames
Surnames of Ukrainian origin